"Sajna" is a 2015 single by Uzair Jaswal. Written by Jaswal himself it was directed by Jaswal's brother Yasir Jaswal and produced by Waqas Hassan. It features Jaswal himself and actors Osman Khalid Butt and Armeena Rana Khan.

It was well received by critics and was nominated in two categories at 4th Hum Awards including, Best Music Single for Uzair and Hum Award for Best Music Video for Yasir. Sajna won both awards for best single and best music video.

Cast and Crew
 Singer: Uzair Jaswal
 Featuring Artist: Osman Khalid Butt and Armeena Rana Khan.
 Lyricist: Uzair Jaswal 
 Music video director: Yasir Jaswal 
 Record Producers: Tajha Malik and Waqas Hassan 
 Record Label: Jaswal Films 
 Cinematography: Mo Azmi 
 Personnel
 Composer: Uzair Jaswal 
 Audio mastering: Sarmad Ghafoor

Accolades
The single receives following nomination at 2016 Hum Awards:

References

2015 songs
2015 singles
Pakistani songs